Rabbi Moshe Nehemiah Kahanov (1817 – 1883) was a rabbi and Jerusalem Talmudist from the Russian Empire inside of what is now Belarus. Toward the end of his life he migrated to Jerusalem where he became Rosh Yeshiva of Etz Chaim Yeshiva.

Biography 
Kahanov was born in the Belorussian territory of the Russian Empire in 1817. He married at the age of 15 before moving to Petrovice, where after three years he became an assistant to the local rabbi. Several years later he became the rabbi of Khaslavich.

Immigration to Jerusalem 
In 1864 Kahanov traveled to Jerusalem, where he was made Rosh yeshiva of Etz Chaim Yeshiva. While serving in this role he tried to expand the curriculum of the yeshiva to include Arabic on the recommendation of his associate Sir Moses Montefiore. Although he was forced to concede that the course should be dropped, because of pressures from traditionalists, Kahanov still pushed for the expansion of the Old Yishuv community, encouraging others to build homes outside of the Old City, like his which was located in Nahalat Shiv'a, and promoting the growth of industrial enterprise. His apparent alignment with progressive thinkers resulted in some people accusing him of secretly being a supporter of the Haskalah movement.

Kahanov died in 1883 while still serving as Rosh yeshiva.

Works Written 
Kahanov's writings included Netivot ha-shalom: ḥeleḳ sheni kolel siman 17 me-Even ha-ʻezer, a commentary on the Shulhan Arukh, along with other commentaries on various laws.

References 

1817 births
1883 deaths
Belarusian rabbis
19th-century rabbis from the Russian Empire
Emigrants from the Russian Empire to the Ottoman Empire
Israeli Rosh yeshivas
Old Yishuv
Talmudists
People of the Haskalah
Burials at the Jewish cemetery on the Mount of Olives
19th-century rabbis in Jerusalem